Frea curta is a species of beetle in the family Cerambycidae. It was described by Chevrolat in 1858. It is known from 
Cameroon, the Ivory Coast, Ghana, Benin, Guinea, Sierra Leone, Nigeria, and Togo.

References

curta
Beetles described in 1858